Eriophora pustulosa, commonly called the garden orb weaver spider, is a common small species of spider found in Australia and New Zealand. The colour of the species varies widely, but they are often brightly coloured.

Eriophora pustulosa has five distinctive spines on its abdomen, two large ones halfway down its back and three smaller ones at the end of its abdomen.

At night, the spider constructs a circular web in which it waits in its middle for prey to fly into and be entangled.

Images

References

Araneidae
Spiders of Australia
Spiders of New Zealand
Spiders described in 1842